The 2015 KPIT MSLTA Challenger was a professional tennis tournament played on hard courts. It was the second edition of the tournament which was part of the 2015 ATP Challenger Tour. It took place at Shree Shiv Chhatrapati Sports Complex in Pune, India from 26 to 31 October 2015.

Singles main-draw entrants

Seeds

 1 Rankings are as of 19 October 2015.

Other entrants
The following players received wildcards into the singles main draw:
  Anvit Bendre
  Aryan Goveas
  Sumit Nagal 
  Vishnu Vardhan

The following players received entry from the qualifying draw:
  Prajnesh Gunneswaran
  Temur Ismailov
  Ranjeet Virali-Murugesan
  Purav Raja

Champions

Singles

 Yuki Bhambri def.  Evgeny Donskoy 6–2, 7–6(7–4)

Doubles

 Gerard Granollers /  Adrián Menéndez Maceiras def.  Maximilian Neuchrist /  Divij Sharan 1–6, 6–3, [10–6]

References

External links
Official Website

2015 in Indian tennis
KPIT MSLTA Challenger
KPIT MSLTA Challenger